Christine Karlsen Alver (born 16 July 2000) is a Norwegian female handball player who plays for Molde Elite.

She also represented Norway in the 2017 European Women's U-17 Handball Championship and in the 2019 Women's U-19 European Handball Championship.

Achievements
Junior European Championship:
Bronze Medalist: 2019
Youth European Championship:
Silver Medalist: 2017

Individual awards
 Best rookie of Eliteserien: 2018/2019
 Topscorer of REMA 1000-ligaen 2021/2022: (206 goals)

References
 

2000 births
Living people
Norwegian female handball players
Sportspeople from Bergen
21st-century Norwegian women